"West End Riot" is a song by Australian punk rock band The Living End. It was released in July 1999, as the fourth single from their self-titled album. It peaked at  83 on the Australian ARIA Singles Chart in August 1999.  The song was more popular with listeners of national radio station, Triple J, appearing at No. 48 on their Hottest 100 poll for that year.

The video for the song was directed by Don Letts, (who also directed a number of The Clash's videos).  It was filmed in London while the band was touring the UK.

A crowd favourite, it is often played at the end of a show, most notably at Festival Hall in 2006.

The song appears in the opening film clip for the video game World of Outlaws: Sprint Cars 2002.

Background
The song title and lyrics refer two boys who are born and raised in two different areas, who play together in the streets with toy guns, but who grow up to live very different lives, with their childhood fun being nothing more than a memory. The song is based on the West and East sides of Melbourne, even though in later years the feud has died down.

Track listing

Personnel
Band members
Chris Cheney – vocals]], guitar
Travis Demsey – drums, backing vocals
Scott Owen – double bass, backing vocals

Recording process
 Producer – Lindsay Gravina 
 Engineer – Lindsay Gravina 
 Assistant engineer – Matt Voight 
 Mastering – Stephen Marcussen at Precision Mastering
 Mixing – Jerry Finn 
 Assistant mixer – Mark and Tony 
 Editing (digital) – Don C. Tyler
 Studios – Sing Sing Studios, Melbourne 
 Mixing studios – Conway Studios, Los Angeles

Artwork
 Cover art – Craig Preston

Charts

Release history

References

1999 singles
Songs about cities
The Living End songs
1999 songs
Modular Recordings singles
Songs written by Chris Cheney
Songs about Australia